Bulletwood is a common name for several plants or trees and may refer to:

Manilkara bidentata and other Manilkara spp.
Mimusops elengi, from India to South East Asia, Asian bulletwood
Mimusops caffra, South Africa and South East Africa, Kaffir bulletwood
Planchonella australis, Yellow, Silver bulletwood
Pouteria pallida, a Caribbean tree, Bastard bulletwood
Sideroxylon salicifolium, Planchonella myrsinoides, White bulletwood 
Humiria balsamifera, from Brazil and North South America, Bastard bulletwood